Document examiner may refer to:

 Questioned document examiner, a professional in the forensic examination of documents
 Symbolics Document Examiner, a software program